Abri is a small town, in the Sudanese wilayat of the Northern state. It is on the river bank of the Nile, and it lies near the second cataract that is now submerged by Lake Nasser. Its population is estimated to be about 40,000 residents.

The next major settlement upriver is the town of Delgo, Sudan, 105 km South.

References

Populated places in Northern (state)